Brushing may refer to:

Tooth brushing, personal hygiene
Hair brushing, personal grooming
Wire brushing, abrasive tool technique
Brushing, in horse grooming
Brushing and linking, in data visualization
Endobronchial brushing, tissue sampling in bronchoscopy
Brushing (e-commerce), a scamming technique